Old Place is a neighborhood located in the northwestern section of Staten Island. The neighborhood is located south of Arlington, and west of Mariners Harbor. It is part of Community Board 1.

Features
The neighborhood has a United Artists movie theater along Forest Avenue, and a Home Depot across the street. There are a few homes along Forest Avenue, but other than that, the only other residential units are the Goethals Homes, located along Goethals Road North just west of Forest Avenue.

There are plans in the future to develop the area with 3-4 story buildings with retail on the ground floor and residential units on the upper floors, with access to the surrounding wetlands.

Demographics
As of the 2010 census, the demographics of Old Place were roughly as follows:
 
50.4% White, 5.4% Black, 38.5% Hispanic, 3.3% Asian, 2.4% Other.

This is defining Old Place as everything within the boundaries of Census Tract 323 south of the railroad tracks.

Transportation
Old Place is served by the  bus and its rush-hour-only limited-stop counterpart, the  bus.

References

Neighborhoods in Staten Island